Carl C. Danberg (born August 29, 1964) is an American judge from Newark in New Castle County, Delaware. He is a member of the Democratic Party and was the attorney general of Delaware, and commissioner of the Delaware Department of Correction. He also serves as a Brigadier general in the Delaware Army National Guard.

Early life and family
Danberg was born in Silver Spring, Maryland, the son of James and Mary Lou Danberg. He is a graduate of the University of Delaware, and Widener University School of Law. He earned a Masters of Strategic Studies at the United States Army War College in 2018. He married Barbara Snapp, a fellow attorney. They have two daughters, reside in Newark and are members of St. John Roman Catholic Church there. He is a former adjunct professor at the University of Delaware, teaching constitutional law of criminal procedure, and is a Brigadier general serving as Assistant Adjutant General (Army) Delaware National Guard.

Professional career
Danberg was the Deputy Principal Assistant to the Commissioner of the Delaware Department of Correction for nearly ten years handling external affairs. He was responsible for community, legislative and media relations, managing victim services, budget preparation and drafting legislation as well as training and advising correction staff. Later he held the position of Chief Deputy Attorney General advising his predecessor on legal and management issues within the Delaware Department of Justice.

On December 7, 2005, he was appointed Delaware Attorney General upon the resignation of M. Jane Brady to accept an appointment to the Delaware Superior Court. His office is elective, and he did not seek reelection when his term expired in January 2007.

On January 3, 2007, he was nominated by Governor Ruth Ann Minner as Commissioner of the Delaware Department of Correction to replace retiring Commissioner Stan Taylor. He took office upon confirmation by the state senate.

Carl was appointed judge of the Court of Common Pleas for New Castle County, State of Delaware by Governor Jack Markell, confirmed by the Delaware Senate and sworn in February 2013.  He was then appointed Chief judge of the Court of Common Pleas for the State of Delaware by Governor John Carney, confirmed by the Delaware Senate and sworn in May 2021.

Almanac
Elections are held the first Tuesday after November 1. The Attorney General takes office the third Tuesday of January and has a four-year term.  Danberg completed a current term.

References

 If Trouble Knocks, it’s not for Carl Danberg

Places with more information
 Delaware Historical Society website; 505 North Market Street, Wilmington, Delaware 19801; (302) 655-7161
 University of Delaware Library website, 181 South College Avenue, Newark, Delaware 19717; (302) 831-2965
 Newark Free Library 750 Library Ave., Newark, Delaware (302) 731-7550.

1964 births
Living people
University of Delaware alumni
Widener University alumni
National Guard (United States) colonels
Delaware lawyers
People from Newark, Delaware
Delaware Democrats
Delaware Attorneys General